Keeratikorn Nilmart (born 20 May 1992) is a Thai professional footballer who plays as a  centre-back.

References

External links
 

1992 births
Living people
Keeratikorn Nilmart
Keeratikorn Nilmart
Association football defenders
Keeratikorn Nilmart
Keeratikorn Nilmart
Keeratikorn Nilmart
Keeratikorn Nilmart